Hedotettix xueshanensis is an insect found in China, belonging to the Tetrigidae family.

See also
Hedotettix grossivalva
Hedotettix brachynota

References

Insects of China
Insects described in 2006
Tetrigidae